A referendum on the dissolution of Parliament, the first referendum ever held in Iran, was held in August 1953. The dissolution was approved by more than 99% of voters.

Following the referendum, there were talks about another referendum to abolish the Pahlavi dynasty and make Iran a republic, however the government was overthrown by a coup d'état shortly after.

Timeline 
12 July: PM Mohammad Mosaddegh openly announced his intention to hold the referendum, asking people to either choose between his government or the 17th Parliament. 
14 July: The decision to hold the referendum was approved by the cabinet.
3 August: The referendum was held in Tehran.
10 August: The referendum was held in other cities.
13 August: The official results of the polls were declared by the interior ministry. 
16 August: Mosaddegh officially announced the dissolution of the parliament. 
19 August: The government was overthrown in a coup d'état.

Campaign

Conduct
The balloting was not secret and there were two separate voting booths, i.e. the opponents of Mossadegh had to cast their vote in a separate tent. Critics pointed that the referendum had ignored the democratic demand for secret ballots.

Results

By city

Reactions

Domestic
 Ayatollah Kashani said taking part in such a referendum is haraam (religiously prohibited). However, Ayatollah Boroujerdi supported the referendum.
 Mohammad Reza Shah declared the results "fraudulant".

International
 : On 5 August 1953, the U.S. President Dwight Eisenhower, speaking to a gathering of state governors in Seattle, criticized Mosaddegh for the decision and specified, that it had been supported by the communist party. An editorial published by The New York Times on 4 August characterized the exercise as "More fantastic and farcical than any ever held under Hitler or Stalin", and an effort by Mosaddegh "to make himself unchallenged dictator of the country".

References

Referendums in Iran
1953 in Iran
Iran
August 1953 events in Asia
17th term of the Iranian Majlis